Michał Mirosław Karol Maciejowski  DFM Lt. pilot. F / L. P-1912 was a Polish fighter ace of the Polish Air Force in World War II.

Early life
Maciejowski (Michael Manson) was born on October 29, 1913 in Gródek Jagielloński. In Rzeszów, he completed the 6-year Jan Sobieski gymnasium. He completed a 2-year Trade School course in Lviv.

Military service 
He was appointed to perform military service in the 40th Infantry Regiment. In 1935, he volunteered to become a pilot to the 6th Pułk Lotniczy in Lviv. From 1936-39 he served in the 6th Aviation Regiment, where he trained as a corpsman. On September 9, together with the staff of the Regiment, he moved to Łuck and Kleań, and on September 12 to Kuty. On September 17, he crossed the border of Romania. He was interned there, but escaped and boarded a ship bound for Syria. At the beginning of 1940, he swam to Marseilles. He arrived in Great Britain in February. He trained at RAF Blackpool Center, assigned to the British 111 Fighter Squadron. On September 4, 1940, he shot down his first plane. During the Battle of Britain he shot down three German planes, and probably damaged one. He fought in the British 249 Fighter Squadron. After training in the 52nd OTU, he was assigned to the 317 Fighter Squadron. He also fought in the 316 Fighter Squadron. 
On August 9, 1943, around 6.30 p.m. during the Ramrod 191 mission he piloted the Spitfire IX designated SZ-E No. BS302. While flying over occupied France, he collided with Lieutenant Lech Kondracki (Spitfire IX marked SZ-R no. BS457). Kondracki died while Maciejowski saved himself by parachuting to the ground. He was captured and Imprisoned in Stalag Luft III. He was liberated and restored to service on June 1, 1945. After a refresher course at 16 FTS Newton, on August 21, he was assigned to Squadron 309 in Coltishall. He remained in the squadron until its dissolution in January 1947. 

He was demobilized from the army with the rank of aviation lieutenant. He changed his name to Michael Manson. He returned to the RAF in June 1951, initially as a test pilot and from 1963 he performed administrative work, before becoming a catering officer. In 1970, he ran the RAF Transit Hotel in Malta. He retired in 1972 as an aviation lieutenant. He lived in England until the death of his wife Christine. In 1987, he moved to Winnipeg, Canada, to live with his only daughter, Karen Schmidt. He died on April 26, 2001, in Winnipeg at age 87.

Awards

  Virtuti Militari, Silver Cross 
  Cross of Valour (Poland), three times
  Distinguished Flying Cross (United Kingdom)
  Distinguished Flying Medal

References

External links
http://www.bbm.org.uk/airmen/Maciejowski.htm

Further reading
 Chronicle of 317 Squadron https://ilot.lukasiewicz.gov.pl/dday/publikacje/kroniki/  
 https://listakrzystka.pl/maciejowski-michal-karol-manson/
 Jerzy B. Cynk, Polskie Siły Powietrzne 1939-1945, AJ-Press 2001, 
 Wacław Król: Zarys działań polskiego lotnictwa w Wielkiej Brytanii 1940-1945, WKiL Warszawa 1990,
 Tadeusz Jerzy Krzystek, Anna Krzystek: Polskie Siły Powietrzne w Wielkiej Brytanii w latach 1940-1947 łącznie z Pomocniczą Lotniczą Służbą Kobiet (PLSK-WAAF). Sandomierz: Stratus, 2012, s. 361. 
 Józef Zieliński: Asy polskiego lotnictwa. Warszawa: Agencja lotnicza ALTAIR, 1994, s. 19. ISBN 83862172. 
 Józef Zieliński: Lotnicy polscy w Bitwie o Wielką Brytanię. Warszawa: Oficyna Wydawnicza MH, 2005, s. 119–120. 
 
 
 
 
 
 
 

The Few
Recipients of the Distinguished Flying Cross (United Kingdom)
Recipients of the Distinguished Flying Medal
Polish World War II flying aces
Royal Air Force officers
Recipients of the Silver Cross of the Virtuti Militari
Recipients of the Cross of Valour (Poland)
1988 deaths
1912 births